The Japan women's national beach handball team is the national team of Japan. It takes part in international beach handball competitions.

World Championships results
2004 – 7th place
2010 – 10th place

References

External links
Official website
IHF profile

Women's national beach handball teams
Women's national sports teams of Japan